The Republic of Macedonia competed at the 2000 Summer Olympics in Sydney, Australia, officially under the name of Former Yugoslav Republic of Macedonia.

Macedonia won its first ever Olympic medal on the final day of competition. Magomed Ibragimov won a bronze medal in wrestling. It was Macedonia's only medal of the 2000 Olympics.

The at-the-time president of Macedonia, Boris Trajkovski, was in Sydney during the Olympic Games and attended the Opening Ceremony.

Medalists

Athletics

Men
Track

Women
Track

Canoeing

Shooting

Swimming

Men

Women

Wrestling

Freestyle

Notes

References
Wallechinsky, David (2004). The Complete Book of the Summer Olympics (Athens 2004 Edition). Toronto, Canada. . 
International Olympic Committee (2001). The Results. Retrieved 12 November 2005.
Sydney Organising Committee for the Olympic Games (2001). Official Report of the XXVII Olympiad Volume 1: Preparing for the Games. Retrieved 20 November 2005.
Sydney Organising Committee for the Olympic Games (2001). Official Report of the XXVII Olympiad Volume 2: Celebrating the Games. Retrieved 20 November 2005.
Sydney Organising Committee for the Olympic Games (2001). The Results. Retrieved 20 November 2005.
International Olympic Committee Web Site

Nations at the 2000 Summer Olympics
2000
Summer Olympics